Silver dichromate is a chemical compound with the formula Ag2Cr2O7. It is insoluble in water and decomposes when treated with hot water. Its anion has a charge of -2.

Synthesis
K2Cr2O7 (aq) + 2 AgNO3 (aq) --> Ag2Cr2O7 (s) + 2 KNO3 (aq)

Applications
Related complexes are used as oxidants in organic chemistry. For instance, tetrakis(pyridine)silver dichromate, [Ag2(py)4]2+[Cr2O7]2−, is used to convert benzylic and allylic alcohols to corresponding carbonyl compounds.

References

 

Silver compounds
Dichromates
Oxidizing agents